The West Walton Formation is a geologic formation in England. It preserves fossils dating back to the Jurassic period .

References

Jurassic England